Paralecta isopela is a moth in the family Xyloryctidae. It was described by Edward Meyrick in 1925. It is found on New Guinea.

The wingspan is about 28 mm. The forewings are uniform pale brownish and the hindwings are white brownish.

References

Paralecta
Taxa named by Edward Meyrick
Moths described in 1925